The Whenuakura River is a river of the Taranaki Region of New Zealand's North Island. It flows south from its origins northeast of Lake Rotorangi and reaches the coast five kilometres southeast of Patea.

See also
List of rivers of New Zealand

References

 

South Taranaki District
Rivers of Taranaki
Rivers of New Zealand